The Sunless Street (Spanish:La calle sin sol) is a 1948 Spanish drama film written by Miguel Mihura and directed by Rafael Gil.

Cast
 Amparo Rivelles as Pilar  
 Antonio Vilar as Mauricio  
 Manolo Morán as Manolo  
 Alberto Romea as Pedro  
 Fernando Fernández de Córdoba
 Ángel de Andrés as José  
 Irene Caba Alba as Diana  
 Julia Caba Alba as Flora  
 Félix Fernández as Basilio 
 José Prada as Inspector  
 Rufino Inglés 
 Juana Mansó as Portera  
 Casimiro Hurtado as Camarero 
 Santiago Rivero as Camarero  
 Chotis
 Mary Delgado as Elvira  
 José Nieto as Luis 
 Manuel Requena

References

Bibliography
 Bentley, Bernard. A Companion to Spanish Cinema. Boydell & Brewer 2008.

External links
 

1948 films
1948 drama films
1940s Spanish-language films
Spanish black-and-white films
Spain in fiction
Films set in Barcelona
Films directed by Rafael Gil
Spanish drama films
1940s Spanish films